Norwegian Bay is an Arctic Ocean waterway in the Qikiqtaaluk Region of Nunavut, Canada. Amund Ringnes Island is to the northwest (separated by the Hendriksen Strait from Cornwall Island), and Axel Heiberg Island is to the north. (Both Amund Ringnes Island and Axel Heiberg Island are part of the Sverdrup Islands.) Ellesmere Island is to the east, and Devon Island is to the south. 

Six islands lie within Norwegian Bay. They are, from largest to smallest:
Cornwall Island (the largest and westernmost)
Graham Island
Buckingham
Table
Exmouth
Ekins

References

 Norwegian Bay at Atlas of Canada

Bays of Qikiqtaaluk Region